Phillip Dos Santos is a Canadian soccer coach. He is currently the general manager and head coach of Valour FC of the Canadian Premier League.

Coaching career

Early career
From 2011 to 2014, Dos Santos served in various roles for the youth sides of the Canada men's national soccer team. He later served as an assistant coach for Ottawa Fury FC, Fort Lauderdale Strikers, San Francisco Deltas, Indy Eleven, and Vancouver Whitecaps FC while his brother Marc Dos Santos was head coach.

Valour FC
On September 23, 2021, Dos Santos was named general manager and head coach of Valour FC of the Canadian Premier League.

Coaching record

Personal life
Dos Santos was born in Montreal and moved to Portugal at age 10. He is fluent in English, French, Portuguese and Spanish. He holds a UEFA A coaching licence.

References

1978 births
Living people
Canadian soccer coaches
Canadian people of Portuguese descent
Soccer people from Quebec
Sportspeople from Montreal
North American Soccer League coaches
Ottawa Fury FC coaches
Fort Lauderdale Strikers coaches
San Francisco Deltas
Indy Eleven coaches
Vancouver Whitecaps FC coaches
Valour FC non-playing staff
Canadian Premier League coaches